Nicholas John Evans (born 6 July 1958) is an English former professional footballer who played in the Football League as a forward.

Nicholas John Evans, born Bedford 6 July 1958, had been rejected by Peterborough and Q.P.R as a youngster and was plying his trade at Kettering Town. Manager Barry Fry signed him in the summer of 1983.

He made his debut on Tuesday 13 September 1983 at Underhill, scoring two goals in a 10–0 victory over Trowbridge Town in the Alliance Premier League Cup, two weeks after which he scored a hat trick in a 4–0 win at Trowbridge in an Alliance Premier League fixture.

Despite being hampered by frequent injuries (which littered his whole career) he scored 17 goals in his first season and although signed first and foremost as a striker Evans often played in the hole behind Mahoney and Atkins in midfield.

The following season he scored another 17 goals from less than 40 starts. In the final game of the season Alliance League Champions Wealdstone visited Underhill but found Evans in form;  he would score four goals in their 7–0 victory.

Nicky was voted Barnet FC Player of the Year in 1985-86 by The Supporters Association as he scored 26 goals in all competitions. Allegedly, Nuneaton Borough offered a sizeable transfer fee for Evans early in the season and with Barnet under financial pressures like many clubs in the renamed Gola League Barry Fry had no choice but to accept. However Evans refused to leave Barnet so the deal was called off, further adding to his cult following among Barnet fans. As a result of his popularity, fans created a chant, "Born is the King of Underhill", which was adapted from the hymn The First Noel. Upon scoring, he would usually perform a military-style salute to the crowd.

In 1986-87 Nicky's 29 goals helped Barnet finish second in the GM conference behind Scarborough. He went one better for the 1987–88 season scoring 30 goals, 12 of which were in the space of 14 days in September 1987. Shortly after the 7–0 win at Loakes Park Wycombe (where Nicky scored 4) it was revealed that he had won second place in Wycombe's Player of the Month due to numerous Bees fans sabotaging the voting slips issued that evening.

Nicky was sold to Wycombe Wanderers in March 1989 for a transfer fee of £32,000. Barry Fry and Barnet Chairman Stan Flashman were heavily criticised by a large contingent of the supporters who felt that Nicky should not have been sold despite the club being in the process of rebuilding.

In January 1991 Barry Fry jumped at the opportunity to return Nicky to his beloved Underhill and a team challenging once again for the GM Vauxhall Conference, spending around £25,000 to resign him. He was welcomed with open arms by the fans and soon reopened his goal account with a brace in a 3–1 win at Boston United. Playing in a deeper role behind strikers Gary Bull and Mark Carter; he later played in the side that beat Fisher Athletic 4-2 to secure Barnet a place in the Football League.

Evans was one of the few players that stayed to help new manager Gary Phillips piece together a team for the season 1993-94 - after the players contractual disputes with the FA - which was to be his last as a player. It was very obvious to all and indeed Nicky himself that it would be impossible and damaging to continue playing at this level with his ankle problems. His final game for Barnet was at Hartlepool United on 2 November 1993. Barnet lost the game 2–1, with Evans scoring his final goal in the defeat.

Barnet rewarded Nicky for his outstanding contributions for over 10 years with a testimonial versus Birmingham City on 13 May 1994. Prior to the game he was presented with a golden hairdryer by the editors of the popular Barnet FC Fanzine, "Two Together". The trophy was in recognition of his well maintained at all times blond hair.

In 1997 in a Barnet Football Club Supporters Association poll he was voted Barnet Player of the Decade 1980s, one of a distinguished list of Barnet legends - Les Eason 1960s, Colin Powell 1970s and Paul Wilson 1990s.

He is currently residing with his family in Bedfordshire.

References

Sources
 
  The Reckless Guide to Barnet FC

1958 births
Living people
Sportspeople from Bedford
English footballers
Association football forwards
Queens Park Rangers F.C. players
Peterborough United F.C. players
Kettering Town F.C. players
Barnet F.C. players
Wycombe Wanderers F.C. players
English Football League players
Footballers from Bedfordshire